Kiera Skeels (born 20 November 2001) is an English professional footballer who plays as a defender for FA WSL club Charlton Athletic.

Club career

Reading

Loan spell at Bristol City 
On 3 February 2021, it was announced that Skeels was going on loan to Bristol City for the rest of the season. She made her debut for Bristol in a 3–0 win at Brighton coming on in the 76th minute. Skeels helped Bristol to the final of the WSL Cup in her first start for the club with a 72nd-minute winner against Leicester.

Charlton Athletic
On 30 July 2021, Skeels was announced as part of Charlton Athletic's squad for the 2021–22 FA Women's Championship.

Career statistics

Club

References 

Living people
2001 births
English women's footballers
England women's youth international footballers
Women's association football defenders
Women's Super League players
Bristol City W.F.C. players
Reading F.C. Women players